Nijangal is a 2016-2017 Tamil-language reality-justice show about real-life situations.  It aired every Monday to Saturday at 12:30PM (IST) on Sun TV and Re telecast Monday to Saturday at 10:00PM (IST) on Sun News from 24 October 2016 to 4 March 2017 for 218 episodes. The Show host by Khushboo Sundar. The show revolves around real life situations and they try to come up with a solution for the same on the channel. It was Produced by Vaidehi Ramamurthy and director by Mani Sridhar.

List of episodes
Some of the topics discussed on the show are:

See also
 List of programs broadcast by Sun TV

References

External links
 Official Website 
 Sun TV on YouTube
 Sun TV Network 
 Sun Group 

Sun TV original programming
Tamil-language reality television series
2010s Tamil-language television series
2016 Tamil-language television series debuts
Tamil-language television shows
2017 Tamil-language television series endings